The United States House of Representatives elections in California, 1867 was an election for California's delegation to the United States House of Representatives, which occurred on September 6, 1867 for the 40th Congress. The Democrats gained two districts from the Republicans.

Results

District 1

District 2

District 3

See also
40th United States Congress
Political party strength in California
Political party strength in U.S. states
United States House of Representatives elections, 1866

References
California Elections Page
Office of the Clerk of the House of Representatives

External links
California Legislative District Maps (1911-Present)
RAND California Election Returns: District Definitions

1867
California United States House of Representatives
1867 California elections